Kevin Bell may refer to:

 Kevin Bell (judge) (born 1954), Australian judge
 Kevin Bell (American football) (1955–2023), former National Football League player
 Kevin Bell (baseball) (born 1955), former Major League Baseball player
 DJ Head (Kevin Bell, born 1971), American hip-hop producer and DJ